Stephen Wilson may refer to:

Stephen Fowler Wilson (1821–1897), U.S. Representative from Pennsylvania
Stephen Victor Wilson (born 1941), U.S. federal judge
Stephen Wilson (historian) (born 1941), English historian
Stephen John Wilson (born 1948), former Australian politician from Tasmania
Stephen Wilson (athlete) (born 1971), Australian track and field athlete
Stephen Wilson (boxer) (born 1971), British boxer
Stephen W. Wilson, United States Air Force Lieutenant General
W. Stephen Wilson, mathematician

See also
Steven Wilson (born 1967), founder of progressive rock band Porcupine Tree
Steve Wilson (disambiguation)